Purnima Das Verma (born Meherbhano Mohammad Ali; 2 March 1934 — 14 August 2013) was an Indian actress who worked predominantly in Hindi-language films. She was the aunt of director Mahesh Bhatt and grandmother of actor Emraan Hashmi.

Personal life
Meherbano Mohammad Ali was born on 2 March 1934. Her elder sister, Shirin, is the mother of directors Mahesh Bhatt and Mukesh Bhatt. Meherbano's first husband was a journalist named Syed Shauqat Hashmi, who moved to Pakistan during the end of colonial rule in South Asia when Pakistan and India were created as new states by the British as they decolonized. Her son from this first marriage, Anwar Hashmi (father of Emraan Hashmi), acted in Baharon Ke Manzil (1968) opposite Farida Jalal. In 1954, she married for the second time with filmmaker Bhagwan Das Verma. Meherbano took the screen name 'Purnima' when she entered the film industry.

Career
Purnima acted in more than 80 Bollywood films. She was a popular actress in Hindi films from late '40s to '50s. She appeared in many films including Patanga (1949), Jogan (1950), Sagai (1951), Jaal (1952), Aurat (1953), a role in Ajay Devgan's debut film Phool Aur Kaante, and the role of Sanjay Dutt's on-screen grandmother in Naam which was directed by Mahesh Bhatt (Purnima's elder sister's son). She also played the role of Amitabh Bachchan's mother in the film Zanjeer.

Death
Purnima had Alzheimer's disease during the last few years of her life and died on 14 August 2013. Mahesh Bhatt later revealed on Twitter, "My aunt Purnima, the first star of our family and who happens to be Emraan Hashmi's grandmother has entered the sunset moments of her life.".

Selected filmography

Patanga (1949)
Jogan (1950)
Sagai (1951)
Badal (1951)
Jaal (1952)
Aurat (1953)
Baghi Sipahi (1958)
Humjoli (1970)
Banphool (1971)
Zanjeer (1973)
Ganga Ki Saugandh (1978)
  Khara Khota  (1981)
Poonam (1981)
Hum Se Badkar Kaun(1981)
Kaalia (1981)
Dharam Kanta (1982)
Inquilaab (1984 film) Amarnath Aunt
 Yaadgar  (1984)
Sadaa Suhagan (1986)

References

Actresses in Hindi cinema
Indian former Muslims
2013 deaths
1934 births
Neurological disease deaths in India
Deaths from Alzheimer's disease
Indian Hindus
Converts to Hinduism from Islam